Joseph Boleslaw Szura (December 18, 1938 – October 13, 2006) was a Canadian professional ice hockey forward who played 90 games in the National Hockey League for the Oakland Seals. Born in Fort William, Ontario, he played 115 games in the World Hockey Association for the Los Angeles Sharks and Houston Aeros.

Career statistics

Regular season and playoffs

External links

Notice of death 

1938 births
2006 deaths
Baltimore Clippers players
Buffalo Bisons (AHL) players
Canadian ice hockey centres
Cape Codders players
Cleveland Barons (1937–1973) players
Houston Aeros (WHA) players
Hull-Ottawa Canadiens players
Ice hockey people from Ontario
Los Angeles Sharks players
Montreal Royals (EPHL) players
North Bay Trappers (EPHL) players
Oakland Seals players
Providence Reds players
Sportspeople from Thunder Bay